Young Township may refer to the following places in the United States:

Young Township, Boone County, Arkansas
Young Township, Dickey County, North Dakota, Dickey County, North Dakota
Young Township, Indiana County, Pennsylvania
Young Township, Jefferson County, Pennsylvania

See also

Young (disambiguation)
Young America Township (disambiguation)

Township name disambiguation pages